Trahaearn ap Caradog (1044 – 1081) was a King of Gwynedd. Trahaearn was a son of Caradog ap Gwyn, ruler of Arwystli (in the south of present-day Montgomeryshire, Wales), a small state, on the south-western border between Gwynedd and Powys. He was born in 1044 in Arwystli, and died in 1081 in Mynydd Carn in Pembrokeshire, at the Battle of Mynydd Carn.

Accession to the throne of Gwynedd 

On the death of Bleddyn ap Cynfyn in 1073, it appears that none of his sons were old enough to claim the throne, and Bleddyn's cousin Trahaearn ap Caradog, seized power.

The same year Gruffudd ap Cynan landed on Anglesey with an Irish force and, with the assistance of the Norman Robert of Rhuddlan, defeated Trahaearn at the Battle of Gwaed Erw in Meirionnydd, gaining control of Gwynedd. However tension between Gruffudd ap Cynan's Irish bodyguard and the local Welsh people led to a rebellion in Llyn and Trahaearn took the opportunity to counterattack, defeating Gruffudd at the Battle of Bron yr Erw at Clynnog Fawr in Caernarfonshire, also in 1073, forcing him to flee back to Ireland.

In 1078 Caradog ap Gruffydd (Prince of the Kingdom of Gwent) killed Rhys ab Owain of Deheubarth, who had been responsible for the killing of Bleddyn ap Cynfyn, in the Battle of Gwdig or Battle of Goodwick. Caradog ap Gruffydd wanted to take control of Deheubarth, like his father and grandfather had done. However Rhys ap Tewdwr, Rhys ab Owain's second cousin, meanwhile had become king of Deheubarth. Rhys ap Tewdwr was forced to flee when Caradog ap Gruffydd invaded Deheubarth in 1081. He sought protection in St David's Cathedral at the far southwestern corner of his kingdom.

Downfall and death 
Gruffudd ap Cynan returned on a second campaign from Ireland with an army of Danes and Irish to become King of Gwynedd. He took his fleet to St David’s and made an alliance with Rhys ap Tewdwr who had recently been ousted as prince of Deheubarth by Caradog ap Gruffydd of Morgannwg. Gruffudd ap Cynan received additional support with backers that came from north Wales. They all agreed to remove Trahaearn ap Caradog from the throne Gwynedd. However, meanwhile Trahaearn had learned of their plot and secretly formed an alliance with Caradog ap Gruffydd and Meilyr ap Rhiwallon. Trahaearn also obtained Norman arbalesters for additional support for his army. The two enemy armies met at the fierce and bloody Battle of Mynydd Carn north of St David's. Trahaearn, Caradog and Meilyr were killed. Gruffudd was victorious and became King of Gwynedd. Rhys ap Tewdwr, Gruffudd's ally, once again became King of Deheubarth.

References

Sources

 Thomas Jones, ed. (1952) Brut y Tywysogion: Peniarth MS. 20 version (University of Wales Press)

1044 births
Trahaearn ap Caradog, Prince of Gwynedd
Monarchs of Gwynedd
Trahaearn ap Caradog, Prince of Gwynedd
House of Mathrafal
11th-century Welsh monarchs
Year of birth unknown
Monarchs killed in action